Minister of Finance of Saint Vincent and the Grenadines is a cabinet minister in charge of the Ministry of Finance of Saint Vincent and the Grenadines, responsible for public finances of the country. The portfolio includes currently also economic planning and information technology.

Ministers of Finance

See also 
 Government of Saint Vincent and the Grenadines
 Economy of Saint Vincent and the Grenadines

References

External links
 Ministry homepage

Government of Saint Vincent and the Grenadines
Politics of Saint Vincent and the Grenadines
Government ministers of Saint Vincent and the Grenadines

Economy of Saint Vincent and the Grenadines